Trochia is a genus of sea snails, marine gastropod mollusks in the family Muricidae, the murex snails or rock snails.

Species
Species within the genus Trochia include:
 Trochia cingulata (Linnaeus, 1771)

References

Ocenebrinae
Monotypic gastropod genera